Double Life may refer to:

 Double life, the life led by a person who has an alter ego
 The literal Greek translation of "amphibian"

Media
 A Double Life (1924 film), a Czech film
 A Double Life (1947 film), a film noir
 A Double Life (1954 film), a French-West German drama film
 Double Life (album), a 2002 album by Värttinä
 "Double Life", a song by Styx from Kilroy Was Here
 "Double Life" (song), a 1979 song by The Cars from their album Candy-O
 "Double Life" (PlayStation ad), a 1999 television advertisement
 Double Life (Invisible Detective), the U.S. title of the first book in the Invisible Detective Series

See also
 Double Live (disambiguation)